Havlíčkův Brod (until 1945 Německý Brod) is a town in Havlíčkův Brod District in the Vysočina Region of the Czech Republic. It has about 23,000 inhabitants. The town centre is well preserved and is protected by law as an urban monument zone.

Administrative parts

Villages of  Březinka, Herlify, Jilemník, Klanečná, Květnov, Mírovka, Poděbaby, Šmolovy, Suchá, Svatý Kříž, Termesivy, Veselice and Zbožice are administrative parts of Havlíčkův Brod. Jilemník and Zbožice form two exclaves of the municipal territory.

Etymology
The Czech word brod means  "ford". The town was firstly named Brod and then Smilův Brod ("Smil's Ford") after its founder Smil of Lichtenburk. In the 14th century it was renamed Německý Brod ("German Ford") because of its predominantly German population. Because of Anti-German sentiment after World War II, the town was renamed Havlíčkův Brod ("Havlíček's Ford") in honor of the writer Karel Havlíček Borovský, who was born nearby and grew up and studied in the town. It was the very first town out of many to be renamed in 1945.

Geography

Havlíčkův Brod is located roughly in the geographical centre of the country. It lies in the Upper Sázava Hills within the Bohemian-Moravian Highlands. The Sázava River flows through the town. Many smaller tributaries of Sázava flows through the municipal territory: Cihlářský Stream, Žabinec, Šlapanka with Stříbrný Stream, Úsobský Stream, Rozkošský Stream, and Břevnický Stream.

There are sets of ponds fed by some of these watercourses. Several ponds on the Cihlářský Stream are located in the urban area. The largest pond of Cihlářský Stream is Cihlář Pond, which serves also recreational purposes and water sports. The largest water body in the municipal territory is the water reservoir Žabinec fed by the eponymous stream.

History

According to a legend recorded by chronicler Wenceslaus Hajek, Brod was founded in 793, however, this year is highly unlikely. The first written mention of a settlement called Brod is from 1234, but it is referred to as probable counterfeit. The first credible mention of Brod is from 1265. The town was founded by Smil of Lichtenburk probably in 1251 on a trade route. In 1308, it was first called Německý Brod.

Brod was first an important mining town focused on silver mining, later it became a centre of crafts and agricultural production. During the Hussite Wars in 1422 as a result of Battle of Deutschbrod, Brod was conquered by Jan Žižka and completely destroyed. The town was resettled by predominantly Czech-speaking population. In 1436, it was bought by the Trčka of Lípa family. Brod was renewed and in the 16th and 17th centuries, it prospered. In 1637, it became a royal town.

The prosperity ended with the Thirty Years' War. Brod was twice conquered and looted. In 1646, 1664 and 1680, the town was affected by plague epidemics. In 1662 and 1676, it was damaged by large fires. The most devastating flood hit the town in 1714.

During the 19th century, economical and cultural development occurred. In 1850, Brod became a district town. Brod was industrialized in the second half of the 19th century with an emphasis on textile and food industry. The railway was built in 1870 and the station later became an important hub.

Until 1918, the town was part of the Austrian monarchy (Austria side after the compromise of 1867), head of the Deutschbrod – Německý Brod District, one of the 94 Bezirkshauptmannschaften in Bohemia.

Demographics

Economy
In Havlíčkův Brod there are medical hospital and mental hospital. Both are among the main employers in the town.

The main industrial employers based in the town are Futaba Czech s.r.o., a manufacturer of car parts, and Pleas a.s., a producer of underwear founded in 1939 which continues the long tradition of the textile industry in the town.

The Havlíčkův Brod Brewery is based in the town. It was founded in 1834.

Transport
Havlíčkův Brod is both road and railway hub. There are five rail lines leading off the main station: to Kolín and Prague (operating since 1870), to Pardubice (1871), to Brno (1898), to Jihlava (1871) and a local line to Humpolec (1894). Historically, the main line running through the town was Vienna–Znojmo–Jihlava–Kolín, but after World War II the line to Brno was rebuilt, made double-track and electrified, and Prague–Havlíčkův Brod–Brno became one of main passenger and freight train routes in Czechoslovakia. Though at the turn of 20th and 21st centuries its importance dropped, as all international expresses were transferred to the 1st National Railway Transit Corridor (via Česká Třebová), it is still a relevant alternative route.

The town is also a crossing of two major Czech roads, No. 34 from České Budějovice to Svitavy and No. 38 from Mladá Boleslav to Jihlava and Znojmo (and on to Vienna).

There is the small Havlíčkův Brod Airport near the town. It serves mainly for sport and sightseeing flying.

Sights

The historic centre was delimited by town fortifications. Several fragments are preserved to this day. In the centre is the Havlíčkovo Square. It is lined by valuable burgher houses in Renaissance and Baroque styles, some of them with preserved Gothic elements.

The landmark of the square is the Old Town Hall. The originally late Gothic house from the late 15th century was reconstructed in the Renaissance style after the huge fire in 1662. It its alcove there is one of symbols of the town, a skeleton of betrayal who opened the gates to the enemy army in 1472 and was punished for it. Today the building serves as a library.

Opposite the Old Town Hall is the New Town Hall. The original building was built in the 13th century and later served as a brewery and military barracks. It was last reconstructed in the Neo-Baroque style in 1884 and since then houses the municipal office. The landmark of the northern part of the square is Havlíčkův House. The Renaissance and Neo-Gothic is owned by the town and houses the Vysočina Museum.

The deanery Church of the Assumption of the Virgin Mary is the oldest church in Havlíčkův Brod. The original early Gothic building from the late 13th century was built by the Teutonic Order. It was rebuilt in 1380, in 1633–1637 and last in the 18th century. The tower includes one of the oldest bells in the country, created in the 1330s. The tower is open to the public.

Štáfl Cottage is a unique folk architecture house, a national cultural monument. The oldest parts of the house are from the 16th century.

Notable people

Jan František Beckovský (1658–1725), historian, writer and translator
Ignác František Mara (1709–1783), cellist and composer
Johann Stamitz (1717–1757), composer and violinist
Josef Dobrovský (1753–1829), philologist and historian; studied here
Karel Havlíček Borovský (1821–1856), writer and poet; lived here
Bedřich Smetana (1824–1884), composer; studied here
Karel Barvitius (1864–1937), publisher
Václav Klofáč (1868–1942), politician
Vilém Kurz (1872–1945), pianist
Jan Zrzavý (1890–1977), painter; studied here
Karel Kuttelwascher (1916–1959), fighter pilot
Pavel Landovský (1936–2014), actor
Jaroslav Holík (1942–2015), ice hockey player and coach
Jiří Holík (born 1944), ice hockey player and coach
Jan Suchý (born 1944), ice hockey player
Josef Augusta (1946–2017), ice hockey player and coach
František Janák (born 1951), glass artist
 Michal Ambrož (1954–2022), musician
Pavel Poc (born 1964), politician
Lenka Šmídová (born 1975), sailor, Olympic winner
Josef Marha (born 1976), ice hockey player
Radek Martínek (born 1976), ice hockey player
Petr Zelenka (born 1976), serial killer
Jan Novák (born 1979), ice hockey player
Tomáš Zdechovský (born 1979), politician
Josef Vašíček (1980–2011), ice hockey player
Antonín Dušek (born 1986), ice hockey player
Marika Šoposká (born 1989), actress
Hynek Zohorna (born 1990), ice hockey player
Tomáš Souček (born 1995), footballer
Radim Zohorna (born 1996), ice hockey player
Vítek Vaněček (born 1996), ice hockey player

Twin towns – sister cities

Havlíčkův Brod is twinned with:
 Brielle, Netherlands (1985)
 Brixen, Italy (1992)
 Spišská Nová Ves, Slovakia (1995)

Havlíčkův Brod also cooperates with other Brods in the Czech Republic: Český Brod, Široký Brod, Uherský Brod, Vyšší Brod and Železný Brod.

Gallery

References

External links

 
Populated places in Havlíčkův Brod District
Cities and towns in the Czech Republic